In High Places may refer to:

In High Places (1943 film), a 1943 Italian film
"In High Places" (song), a 1983 song by Mike Oldfield from his album Crises
In High Places (Hailey novel), a 1962 novel by Arthur Hailey
In High Places (Turtledove novel), a 2005 novel by Harry Turtledove

See also
Friends in High Places (disambiguation)